The Vortex is a novel written in 1924 by the Colombian author José Eustasio Rivera. It is set in at least three different bioregions of Colombia during the rubber boom. This novel narrates the adventures of Arturo Cova, a hot-headed proud chauvinist and his lover Alicia, as they elope from Bogotá, through the eastern plains and later, escaping from criminal misgivings, through the amazon rainforest of Colombia.

In this way Rivera is able to describe the magic of these regions, with their rich biodiversity, and the lifestyle of the inhabitants. However, one of the main objectives of the novel is to reveal the appalling conditions that workers in the rubber factories experience. La Vorágine also introduces the reader to the tremendous hardship of enduring the overwhelming and adverse environment of the rainforest, as the protagonists (Arturo Cova and Alicia) get lost and are unable to be found. As the book says: ¡Los devoró la selva! (literally, "The jungle devoured them!").

The novel is written in an elegant and refined prose, full of metaphors and prosaic poetry, that shows the beauty and exoticism of the virgin rainforest.

La Vorágine is noteworthy as the seminal novel of Latin American regionalism, the "jungle novel", and recognised as one of the best novels written in Colombia.

English translation
Rivera, José Eustasio The Vortex. Earle K. James, translator (1928). Panamericana Editorial Ltd (2003). .

1924 novels
Spanish-language books
20th-century Colombian novels
Novels set in Colombia
Colombian novels adapted into films